Watson Glacier is in Snoqualmie National Forest in the U.S. state of Washington, on the north slope of Mount Watson. Watson Glacier retreated  between 1950 and 2007 and is now only  in length.

See also
List of glaciers in the United States

References

Glaciers of the North Cascades
Glaciers of Whatcom County, Washington
Glaciers of Washington (state)